Sarah James Eddy (May 3, 1851 – March 29, 1945) was an American artist and photographer who specialized in the platinotype process, also known as platinum prints. She was active in abolition, reform, and suffragist movements, and was a philanthropist as well as instrumental in the founding of the Rhode Island Humane Society. She was inducted into the Rhode Island Heritage Hall of Fame in 2017.

Early life 
Eddy was born in Boston, Massachusetts, to James Eddy, who worked as a painter and engraver, and Elisa Eddy (née Jackson). Her maternal grandfather was the abolitionist, Francis Jackson, and her maternal great uncle was Massachusetts politician, William Jackson, who was also against slavery. On her paternal side, Eddy comes from a large New England family that originally came from Cranbrook, Kent.

Eddy studied painting and sculpture at the Pennsylvania Academy of Fine Arts and New York's Art Students League. One of her teachers was Christian Schussele. Eddy began exhibiting photographs in 1890, at nearly 40 years of age. Her most important exhibitions were at the New School of American Photography and the selection of American Women photographers at the Paris Universal Exposition of 1900.

Career

Photography 
Eddy's photography appeared in American and foreign exhibitions until about 1910. She preferred photographing women, children, and artists, and her photographs were included in camera club exhibitions in Providence and Hartford, and were frequently shown at the Boston Camera Club. Juries for photography salons accepted her work in Philadelphia (1898), Pittsburgh (1899, 1900), and Washington, D.C. (1896). In 1903, her pictures were included in salons in Chicago, Cleveland, Minneapolis, and Toronto.

In 1894, Eddy wrote and illustrated a short article "A Good Use for the Camera" for The American Annual of Photography. In the article, Eddy concludes that the personal interactions she had with her photographic subjects were as rewarding as the finished images. She writes, "We enter into sympathetic relations with the people who furnish us with pictures. We are grateful to them and they are very grateful to us. We meet on common ground." The American Annual of Photography subsequently ran illustrations by her in 1895 and 1902.

Painting 
In 1883, Eddy painted a portrait of African-American social reformer, Frederick Douglass. In the portrait, Douglass holds a baton that symbolizes his authority during his tenure as marshal of the District of Columbia. Douglass sat for the portrait twice during the summer of 1883. Eddy also painted a portrait of Susan B. Anthony, a copy of which was donated to Bryn Mawr College in 1920.

Activism and philanthropy

Abolitionism and suffragist rights 
Eddy's mother and other family members were active in the anti-slavery and suffrage movements. Eddy herself was a member of the National American Woman Suffrage Association.

Animal welfare 
An animal welfare activist and vegetarian, Eddy founded the Rhode Island Humane Education Association. Between 1899 and 1938, Eddy wrote or compiled five children's books on animals and their care, which featured photographs of her own felines. At her death, she was the director of the Massachusetts Society for the Prevention of Cruelty to Animals.

Eddy financed the 1894 American edition of Henry Stephens Salt's book Animals' Rights.

Personal life 
Eddy, who never married, died in her Bristol Ferry, Portsmouth, Rhode Island, home, on March 29, 1945, at age ninety-three. She was buried in the North Burial Ground in Providence, Rhode Island.

Gallery

Library of Congress

Selections from Alexander and some other cats (1929)

Works and publications 
 
 
 . Translated in spanish in Amigos y auxiliares del hombre, Boston : Ginn & Company, 1901. Reading on Hathi Trust.

References

Further reading

External links 

 Sarah Eddy at Portsmouth Historical Society
 Guide to the Sarah J. Eddy and Albert Leffingwell Correspondence 1895-1905

1851 births
1945 deaths
American women photographers
Artists from Boston
American animal welfare workers
American abolitionists
American suffragists
American vegetarianism activists
Art Students League of New York alumni
Burials at North Burying Ground (Providence)
Pennsylvania Academy of the Fine Arts alumni
People associated with the MSPCA-Angell
Photographers from Massachusetts
Women civil rights activists